Louisiana Highway 48 (LA 48) is a state highway in Louisiana that serves St. Charles and Jefferson Parishes. It runs from west to east, parallel to the east bank of the Mississippi River, from Norco to Jefferson. Throughout its run, LA 48 is known as Apple Street, River Road, 3rd Street, Reverend Richard Wilson Drive, and Jefferson Highway.

Route description
From the west, LA 48 begins at an intersection with US 61 (Airline Highway) in Norco.  Then known as Apple Street, it runs southward as an undivided two-lane highway.  When it reaches the Mississippi River, it turns eastward to follow and run parallel to it as River Road.  It intersects LA 627, dividing and expanding to four lanes briefly at the interchange with I-310, followed by intersections at LA 626 and LA 50 as it continues downriver through the St. Charles Parish communities of New Sarpy, Destrehan, St. Rose, and Almedia.  As it enters Jefferson Parish and the city of Kenner, it becomes known as 3rd Street and then Reverend Richard Wilson Drive.  The road becomes a divided four-lane street at Williams Boulevard, and upon crossing from Kenner into River Ridge at Filmore Street, it becomes known as Jefferson Highway.  After passing through Harahan, LA 48 shortly merges with US 90 at the east bank base of the Huey P. Long Bridge and LA 3152 (South Clearview Parkway) in Elmwood, becoming a six-lane divided highway through the concurrency.  LA 48 ends at Central Avenue in Jefferson, and US 90 continues along Jefferson Highway toward New Orleans.

History

Almost all of LA 48 follows the historic Jefferson Highway auto trail designated in 1916 and was once the main traffic route from New Orleans to Baton Rouge and points north in the state.  In 1921, this became State Route 1 in the pre-1955 Louisiana highway system and the original alignment of US 61 in 1926.  US 61 was removed from the route of today's LA 48 in 1933, 1935, and 1940 as various sections of the Airline Highway were completed between the Bonnet Carré Spillway and New Orleans.  The route retains the name of Jefferson Highway east of Kenner.

LA 48 originally turned northward from its present eastern terminus and followed Central Avenue to US 61 (Airline Highway).  Central Avenue became a local road in 2012, truncating the route of LA 48 and eliminating altogether LA 611-2 which included the remainder of Central Avenue south of US 90.

Major intersections

References

External links

La DOTD State, District, and Parish Maps
District 02
St. Charles Parish
Jefferson Parish (North Section)

0048
048
Transportation in St. Charles Parish, Louisiana
Transportation in Jefferson Parish, Louisiana
1955 establishments in Louisiana